Shy Nobleman (born July 2, 1974) is an Israeli rock musician, singer, songwriter, producer, keyboardist, guitarist and sports broadcaster.

Discography

Solo albums
 2001 – How to Be Shy
 2005 – Beautiful Life
 2013 – My Day is a Dream (Yomi Hu Halom Hebrew album)
 2021 - ‘The Killing Angel’ (single)

External links
 Official Website
 Bandcamp store
 Shy Nobleman on CD Baby
 Shy Nobleman on iTunes
 Shy Nobleman on Muiscaneto

1974 births
21st-century Israeli male singers
Israeli rock singers
Jewish Israeli musicians
Living people
Israeli record producers
People from Ramat Gan
Israeli rock guitarists
21st-century guitarists